Orit Peleg (born 1983) is an Israeli computer scientist, biophysicist and Assistant Professor in the Computer Science Department and the BioFrontiers Institute at the University of Colorado Boulder in Boulder, CO. She is also an External Professor of the Santa Fe Institute. She is known for her work on collective behavior of insects and the biophysics of soft living systems, including honeybees and fireflies. Applications of her work range from human communication, smart-material design, and swarm robotics. She has won national and international awards and prizes, including a Cottrell Scholars Award in 2022 and being named a National Geographic Explorer in 2021.

Education and academic career 
Peleg completed her Bachelor's and Master's degrees in Physics and Computer Science at Bar-Ilan University in Ramat Gan, Israel in 2007. She received her PhD in 2012 from ETH Zurich, where she studied competitive interactions in biological systems. Her doctoral research considered the physics of biological nanopores. Peleg then moved to Harvard University, where she was a postdoctoral fellow in the Department of Chemistry and Chemical Biology and then the School of Engineering and Applied Sciences. There she worked on the evolution of protein interactions and the morphology of honeybee swarms.

Research and career 
In 2018, Peleg joined the faculty of the University of Colorado Boulder in the Computer Science Department and the BioFrontiers Institute. In 2019 she was  appointed to the Santa Fe Institute. Her research considers how living organisms generate and interpret signals for the purpose of communication.

Fireflies 
Peleg revealed that fireflies synchronize their flashing and that there is a critical density that must be reached before the fireflies can get in rhythm with one another. This work was covered by popular news outlets, including National Geographic, NPR, and The New York Times.

Honey bee communication 
Peleg is interested in the communication of honey bees, which she believes can aid the conservation of pollinating insects. She uncovered how swarms of honey bees communicate through scenting to create scent "maps" so that the swarm can locate the queen bee.  Peleg demonstrated that honey bees collaborate in clusters to respond to mechanical forces when the swarm is shaken, and that honey bees collaborate to create air ventilation in congested nest cavities.

Awards and honors 
 2022 Cottrell Scholar Award from Research Corporation for Science Advancement.
 2021 Junior Scientific Award of the Complex Systems Society “for her contributions to the understanding of collective dynamics”.
 2021 National Geographic Explorer Grantee for "High-throughput Automatic Monitoring Tools for Firefly Conservation".
 2019 Appointed as External Faculty at Santa Fe Institute
 2019 Elected as Member–at–Large at the Executive Committee of the Division of Biological Physics, American Physical Society 
 2016 Selected for Rising Stars in Physics at MIT

Select publications

References

External links 

 Peleg Lab Website

Biophysicists
Computer scientists
21st-century Israeli physicists
University of Colorado Boulder faculty
ETH Zurich alumni
Bar-Ilan University alumni
People from Ramat Gan
1981 births
Living people